Moralı Damat Hasan Pasha (Modern  or Moralı Damat Hasan Pasha;  1658, Tripolice, Morea – 1713, Urfa) was a Grand Vizier of the Ottoman Empire of Greek origin. He was also a two-time governor of Egypt.

Biography

He was born of Greek ancestry in the Morea, and was converted to Islam early on at the Enderun School through the Devşirme Christian child tax system. He initially served as an Armourer and rose to the post of Grand Vizier, where he served between 1703 and 1704. He married Hatice Sultan, the daughter of Sultan Mehmed IV, taking on the epithet "Damat" (Turkish: bridesgroom, son-in-law), and was eventually exiled with his wife to Izmit.

References

See also
 List of Ottoman Grand Viziers
 List of Ottoman governors of Egypt
 Greek Muslims

1658 births
1713 deaths
17th-century Ottoman governors of Egypt
18th-century Ottoman governors of Egypt
17th-century Grand Viziers of the Ottoman Empire
18th-century Grand Viziers of the Ottoman Empire
Greek former Christians
Converts to Islam from Eastern Orthodoxy
People from Tripoli, Greece
People from the Ottoman Empire of Greek descent
Ottoman governors of Egypt
Greek slaves from the Ottoman Empire
Damats
Former Greek Orthodox Christians